Replicon may refer to:

Replicon (genetics), a region of DNA or RNA that replicates from a single origin of replication
Replicon (company), a software company providinand expense management software